This is a list of tributaries of the River Ribble in north-west England.

Estuary to Preston

Estuary to Douglas
Crossens Pool
The Sluice
Middle Drain
Back Drain
Ring Ditch
Boundary Drain
Tarleton Runner
Mere Brow
School Drain
Pale Ditch
Mere Brow Watercourse
Midge Hall Drain
Boat House Sluice
Langley's Brook
Rufford Boundary Sluice
Three Pools Waterway
Fine Jane's Brook
Holly Brook
Sandy Brook
Old Canal
Boundary Brook
New Cut Brook
Sandy Brook
The Old Pool
Black Brook
Drummersdale Drain
Brook Cut and Mill Stream
Bullen's Brook
Eas Brook
Hurlston Brook
Main Drain
Liggard Brook
Wrea Brook
Hundred End Gutter
Pool Stream

River Douglas watershed
River Douglas or River Asland
Longton Brook
Centre Drain
Carr Heys Watercourse
Tarra Carr Gutter
Hall Pool
Dunkirk Dib
Rakes Brook
Carr Brook
Strine Brook
River Yarrow
River Lostock
Wymott Brook
Clayton Brook
Slack Brook
Whave's Brook
Spent Brook
Syd Brook
Howe Brook
Pye Brook
Culbeck Brook
Chapel Brook
Ransnap Brook
German Brook
Hodge Brook
River Chor
Clancutt Brook
Tanyard Brook
Whittle Brook
Eller Brook
Moss Ditch
Black Brook
Tan House Brook
Warth Brook
Brinscall Brook
Fill Brook
Roaring Lum
Dean Brook
Hall Brook
Cote Slack
Limestone Brook
Green Withins Brook
The Sluice
Mill
Old Reed Brook
Main Ditch
Eller Brook
Wham Ditch
Black Brook
Abbey Brook
New Park Brook
Castle Brook
Sefton Brook
Dungeon Brook
Dicket's Brook
Goose Brook
Mill Ditch
New Reed Brook
Bentley Brook
River Tawd
Slate Brook
Grimshaw Brook
Middlehurst Brook
Dock Brook
Alder Lane Brook
Sprodley Brook
Calico Brook
Lees Brook
Dean Brook
Sand Brook
Ackhurst Brook
Mill Brook
Bradshaw Brook
Close Brook
Barley Brook
Smithy Brook
Poolstock Brook
Ince Brook
Hawkley Brook
Reed Brook
Park Brook
Clarington Brook
Bradley Brook
Bucklow Brook
Moss Ditch
Buckow Brook
Hic-bibi Brook
Stars Brook
Almond Brook
Tunley Brook
Pearl Brook
Arley Brook

Douglas to Preston
Freckleton Pool
Dow Brook
Spen Brook
Carr Brook
Wrongway Brook
Middle Pool
Ribble Link / Savick Brook
Deepdale Brook
Lady Head Runnel
Sharoe Brook
Moss Leach Brook
Eaves Brook
Mill Brook
The Mains Brook

River Darwen watershed
River Darwen
Hennel Brook
Cockshott Brook
Many Brooks
Black Brook
Hatchwood Brook
Fowler Brook
Drum Head Brook
Gorton Brook
Mill Brook
Bank Head Brook
Old Darwen
Beeston Brook
Quaker Brook
Hole Brook
Huntley Brook (North)
Huntley Brook (South)
Alum House Brook
Arley Brook
Trout Brook
River Roddlesworth
Finnington Brook
Stockclough Brook
Whitehalgh Brook
Shaw Brook
Chapels Brook
Sheep Bridge Brook
Rake Brook
Calf Hey Brook
Ferny Bed Springs
River Blakewater
Snig Brook
Audley Brook
Little Harwood Brook
Royshaw Clough
Seven Acre Brook
Knuzden Brook
Scotshaw Brook
Moss Brook
Badger Brook
Higher Croft Brook
Newfield Brook
Davy Field Brook
Flash Brook
Grimshaw Brook
Waterside Brook
Mean Brook
Sapling Clough
Hoddlesden Moss Brook
Far Scotland Brook
Pickup Bank Brook
Moss Brook
Twitchells Brook
Sunnyhurst Brook
Stepback Brook
Bold Venture Brook
High Lumb Brook
Livesey Brook
Kebbs Brook
Green Lowe Brook
Bury Fold Brook
Old Briggs Brook
Duckshaw Brook
Grain Brook
Bent Hall Brook
Deadman's Clough

Preston to Whalley
Swill Brook
Bezza Brook
Wilcock Brook
Mellor Brook
Tun Brook
Stydd Brook
Boyce's Brook
Cowley Brook
Page Brook
Duddel Brook
Starling Brook
Dean Brook
Bailey Brook
Brownslow Brook
Dinckley Brook
Park Brook
Showley Brook
Knotts Brook
Tottering Brook
Zechariah Brook

River Calder watershed
River Calder
Bushburn Brook
Dean Brook
Egg Syke Brook
Rodger Hey Brook
Sabden Brook
Badger Well Water
Wood House Brook
Cock Clough
Clough Syke Brook
Hyndburn Brook
Harwood Brook
Causeway Brook
Norden Brook
Spaw Brook
Shaw Brook
Bottom Syke
River Hyndburn
Church Brook
Accrington Brook
Woodnook Water
Warmden Brook
Tom Dale Clough
White Ash Brook
Wolfenden Syke
Lottice Brook
Tinker Brook
Whams Brook
Jackhouse Brook
Cocker Brook
White Syke
Cocker Lumb
Syke Side Brook
Clough Brook
Simonstone Brook
Shorten Brook
Dean Brook
Huntroyde Brook
Castle Clough Brook
Castle Clough
Green Brook
Shaw Brook
Sweet Clough
Hapton Clough
Thorny Bank Clough
Tower Brook
Habergham Clough
New Barn Clough
Helm Clough
Micklehurst Clough
Long Syke
Whitaker Clough
Fir Trees Brook
West Close Clough
Acres Brook
Moor Isles Clough
Spurn Clough
Pendle Water
Old Laund Clough
Edge End Brook
Walverden Water
Bradley Syke
Clough Head Beck
Dobson Syke
Catlow Brook
Pighole Clough
Pathole Beck
New Laithe Clough
Float Bridge Beck
Swains Plat Clough
Colne Water
Swinden Clough
Wanless Water
Slipper Hill Clough
Houses Beck Moss
Moss Houses Beck
Guy Syke
Church Clough Brook
Trawden Brook
Beardshaw Beck
Round Hole Beck
Will Moor Clough
River Laneshaw
High Laith Beck
Sykes Beck
Shawhead Beck
Monkroyd Beck
Hullown Beck
Swamp Syke
Laneshaw Brook
Round Holes Beck
Cat Stone Clough
Wycoller Beck
Ratten Clough
Smithy Clough
Deep Clough Beck
Nan Hole Clough
Turnhole Clough
Butter Leach Clough
Saucer Hill Clough
Blacko Water
Castor Gill
Claude's Clough
Admergill Water
Wicken Clough
Greystone Clough
Sandyford Clough
White Hough Water
Dimpenley Clough
Bird Holme Clough
Barley Water
Deep Clough
Black Moss Water
Water Gate
Warth Beck
Ogden Clough
Boar Clough
White Slacks
Dry Clough
Barden Clough
River Brun
River Don
Walshaw Clough
Thursden Brook
Ell Clough
Black Clough
Hey Stacks Clough
Tom Groove
Swinden Water
Hell Clough
Hurstwood Brook
Smallshaw Clough
Rock Water
Cant Clough Beck
Everage Clough
Hole House Clough
Buck Clough
Dick Clough
Easden Clough
Black Clough
Green Clough
Copy Clough
Sheddon Clough

River Hodder watershed
River Hodder
Cow Ark Brook
Mill Brook
Hagg Clough
River Loud
Leagram Brook
Hill Clough
Burnslack Brook
Chipping Brook
Greystoneley Brook
Hell Clough
Dinkling Green Brook
Withins Clough
Red Syke
Fielding Clough
Langden Brook
Hareden Brook
Lane Foot Brook
Fog Hill Clough
Cherry Gutter
Crackling Syke
Dimples Clough
Losterdale Brook
Trough Brook
Mere Clough Wham
Bleadale Water
Stransdale Brook
Stransdale Gutter
Robin Clough
River Dunsop
Brennand River
Round Hill Water
Brown Syke
Whitendale River
Sandy Gutter
Black Brook
Rough Syke
Grey Gill
Heaning Brook
Birkett Brook
Crimpton Brook
Foulscales Brook
Bonstone Brook
Crag Beck
Easington Brook
Sough Clough
Rye Clough
Skelshaw Brook
Langcliff Cross Brook
Tinklers Brook
Anna Land Brook
Harrop Brook
Dean Slack Brook
King Syke
Dunnow Syke
Croasdale Brook
Eller Beck
Lanshaw Brook
Davison's Syke
Clough Beck
Dunsop Brook
Hill Wood Syke
Moor Syke
Round Hill Syke
Black Brook
Hind Slack
Barn Gill
Park Beck
Dugdale Syke
Phynis Beck
Wain Hill Syke
Bottoms Beck
Hesbert Hall Syke
Hindley Head Clough
Thorp Syke
Dob Dale Beck
Nursery Beck
Brock Clough Beck
Brown Hills Beck
Ash Clough Swamp
Hasgill Beck
Cowgill Syke
Rigg Gill Syke
Copter Syke
Hare Clough Beck
White Syke
Kearsden Holes
Red Syke

Whalley to Paythorne
Barrow Brook
Pig Hill Brook
Barrow Clough
Pendleton Brook
Mearley Brook
Shaw Brook
Worston Brook
Rad Brook
Howcroft Brook
Bashall Brook
Hollins Clough
Cow Hey Brook
Sandy Ford Brook
Braddup Clough
Elm Clough
Waddington Brook
Coplow Brook
Greg Sike
West Bradford Brook
Brocklehurst Brook
Drakehouse Brook
Porters Brook
Bradford Brook
Moor Roads Sike
West Clough Brook
Grindleton Brook
Chatburn Brook
Smithies Brook
Swanside Beck
Stankhill Beck
Gazegill or Rimington Beck
Thistleber Beck
Eel Beck
Widow Hill Beck
Skell Banks Syke
Howgill Beck
Whytha Beck
Collaver Syke
Crag Clough
Dudland Syke
Cow Gill Beck
Ings Beck
Twiston Beck
Pendle Hill Brook
Clough Beck
Gill Beck
Rathmill Sike
Hollins Syke
Skinners Sike
Sliping Brook
Hell Syke
Hill Brook
Skirden Beck
Holden Beck
Mear Gill
Fell Brook
Bay Gate Brook
Far Fields Brook
Black Brook
Holden Beck
Threap Green Brook
Kirk Beck
Fox Gill Beck
Gill Bottom Beck
Bier Beck
Hungrill Beck
Higher Syke
Bleara Syke
Varleys Syke
Cuddy Syke
Monubent Beck
Hen Gill Beck
Agden Beck
Mere Syke
Grunsagill Beck
Tosside Beck
Holden Beck or Moor End Beck
New Gill Beck
Bond Beck
Little Beck
Sandy Syke
Walkers Clough
Fooden Gill
Park House Beck
Wheatley Beck
Ellenthorpe Gill

Paythorne to source
Stock Beck
Spittle Syke
Horton Beck
Bottom Beck
Lodge Hill Syke
Old Park Syke
Wedacre Syke
Hesketh Rough Syke
Flush Beck
Hell Forest Dike
Turpit Gate Syke
Hayfield Dike
Tosber Syke
Fools Syke
Ray Gill Water
Ray Gill
Horrox Gill
Crownest Syke
Gillians Beck
Moor Side Beck
East Beck
Carholme Beck
Ray Gill
Ged Beck
Swinden Gill Beck
Mallardale Beck
Mansell Beck
Pan Beck
Hellifield Beck
Gallaber Syke
Bend Gate Syke
Kell Well Beck
Candle Rush Beck
Deep Dale Syke
Long Preston Beck
Bookil Gill Beck
Scaleber Beck
Old Field Syke	
Crow Hill Syke
Wigglesworth Beck
Tofts Syke
Rough Syke
Rathmell Beck
Hollow Gill Beck
Rathmell Goit
Skir Beck
Mear Beck
Swaw Beck
Carr Beck
Tems Beck
Huntworth Beck
Lodge Gill
Stainforth Beck
Catrigg Beck
Cowside Beck
Tongue Gill
Fornah Gill
How Beck
Blind Beck
Turn Dub
Selside Beck
Gillgarth Beck
Coppy Gill
Cosh Knott Well

Pre-Ribble

Cam Beck
Cam Beck (aka Ling Gill Beck)
Brow Gill Beck
Ling Gill Beck
Labour Gill
Poverty Gill
Hard Turf Gill
Dry Gill
Little Bank Gill
Foul Gutter
Rush Gill
Lamb Fold Gill
Little Intake Gill
Middle Gill
Tur Gill
Grainings Gill
Red Sike
Pot Close Gill

Gayle Beck
Gayle Beck
Axletree Gill
Gate Cote Gill
White Earth Gill
High Springs
Lat Gill
Long Gill
Mares Gill
Far Mares Gill
Shivery Gill
Jam Sike
Ouster Gill

References

 
 
 
Ribble
Ribble